is a women's volleyball team based in Ōtsu, Shiga, Japan. It plays in V.League Division 1. The club was founded in 2000. The owner of the team is Toray Industries.
The jersey number of the team is the order of the age (excluding foreigners).

Honours
V.League/V.Premier
Champions　(4): 2007-08, 2008–09, 2009–10 and 2011–12
Runners-up (4): 2003-2004, 2010-11, 2012-13, 2018-2019, 2020–21
Kurowashiki All Japan Volleyball Championship
Champions (4): 2002, 2004, 2009 and 2010
Runners-up (2): 2012 and 2014
Empress's Cup 
Champions (2): 2007-08, 2011
Runners-up (2): 2010, 2012
Domestic Sports Festival (Volleyball)
Champions (2): 2007. 2011
Runners-up (4): 2005, 2008, 2010, 2012

League results

Players

Current squad
2021-2022 Squad as of 10 September 2021

Former players

Domestic players

Yuko Sano (2000-2004)
Nene Tomita (2001-2008)
Hisako Mukai (2000-2008)
Erika Araki (2003-2008)
Yuka Higashiyama (2005-2009)
Kotomi Matsushita (2007-2009)
Sayoko Komatsuzaki (2007-2009)
Aki Shibata (2000-2010) 
Kana Oyama (2003-2010)
Miki Oyama (2004-2010)
Miya Sato (2005-2010)
Honami Tsukiji (2008-2011)
Mariko Mori (2002-2012)
Saori Kimura (2005-2012) (2014–2017)
Saori Sakoda (2006–2017)
Erika Araki (2009-2013)
Kanari Hamaguchi (2004-2013)
Marie Wada (2006-2013)
Yukari Miyata (2008-2014)
Hitomi Nakamichi (2004–2015)
Kaori Kodaira (2008–2015)
Azusa Futami (2011–2015)
Kanami Tashiro (2009-2018)
Mari Horikawa (2011–2020)
Moe Hidaka (2017–2020)
Kaho Ōno (2010–2021)
Nozomi Itoh (2012–2021)
Misaki Shirai (1014-2022)
Yuki Higane (2021-2022)

Foreign players
 
Liesbet Vindevoghel (2010-2011)
 
Zhang Yuehong (2008-2009)
 
Bethania de la Cruz (2007-2008)
Yonkaira Peña (2013-2014)
 
Manon Flier (2011-2012)
 
Aleona Denise Santiago-Manabat (2018-2019)
 
Stephanie Enright (2012-2013)
 
Jelena Nikolić (2005-2006)
 
Cynthia Barboza (2009-2010)

Coaching staff
Head coach
 2000 - 2005 : Minoru Tatsukawa
 current : Akira Koshiya

References

Japanese volleyball teams
Volleyball clubs established in 2000
Sports teams in Shiga Prefecture
Mitsui
Women's sports teams in Japan
Toray Industries
2000 establishments in Japan